Terry Moore (born Helen Luella Koford; January 7, 1929) is an American film and television actress who began her career as a child actor. She was nominated for the Academy Award for Best Supporting Actress for her performance in Come Back, Little Sheba (1952). She is one of the last surviving stars from the Golden Age of Hollywood.

Biography

Child actress
Moore was born January 7, 1929, in Glendale, California, and grew up in a Mormon family in Los Angeles. She worked as a child model before making her film debut in Maryland (1940). She was billed as Judy Ford, Jan Ford, and January Ford before taking Terry Moore as her name in 1948.

Moore's early appearances include The Howards of Virginia (1940), On the Sunny Side (1942), My Gal Sal (1942), A-Haunting We Will Go (1942), True to Life (1943), Gaslight (1944) (playing Ingrid Bergman as a child), Since You Went Away (1944), Sweet and Low-Down (1944), and The Clock (1945). 
As Helen Koford, she had a supporting role in Son of Lassie (1945) and Shadowed (1946). As "Jan Ford" she was billed third in The Devil on Wheels (1947) at Monogram. She was uncredited in Heartaches (1948) and Summer Holiday (1948).

Moore worked in radio in the 1940s, most memorably as Bumps Smith on The Smiths of Hollywood.

Columbia
Moore's career received a boost when Columbia Pictures signed her to a long-term contract. She had the lead in The Return of October (1948) with Glenn Ford, playing a character called Terry Ramsey, after which Terry became her stage name.

Moore was borrowed by RKO to star in Mighty Joe Young (1949), a film about a giant gorilla that won the Academy Award for Best Visual Effects. George Pal cast her in The Great Rupert (1950) with Jimmy Durante.

At Columbia, Moore co-starred with Mickey Rooney in He's a Cockeyed Wonder (1950). She also did Gambling House (1950) with Victor Mature at RKO, Two of a Kind (1951), Sunny Side of the Street (1951), and The Barefoot Mailman (1951).

Moore played Marie Buckholder in Come Back, Little Sheba (1952), produced by Hal Wallis, with Burt Lancaster and Shirley Booth as co-stars. She was nominated for an Academy Award for Best Supporting Actress for her performance.

Moore began appearing in television shows like The Ford Television Theatre and appeared on the cover of Life magazine on July 6, 1953, as "Hollywood's sexy tomboy". Her photo was used on the cover of the second issue of the My Diary romance comic book (cover dated March 1950).

20th Century Fox
Elia Kazan cast Moore in the female lead in the 20th Century Fox drama Man on a Tightrope (1953). Fox then signed Moore to a long-term contract. It gave her the female lead in Beneath the 12-Mile Reef (1953), the second film in CinemaScope and a big hit. Also popular was King of the Khyber Rifles (1953) with Tyrone Power.

Moore supported Fred Astaire in Daddy Long Legs (1955) and had the lead in some thrillers: Shack Out on 101 (1955) and Portrait of Alison (1955).

Between Heaven and Hell (1956) reunited her with Robert Wagner, the leading man in Beneath the 12-Mile Reef. She guest-starred on TV shows like The 20th Century-Fox Hour, General Electric Theater, Playhouse 90, Climax!, Studio One in Hollywood, and Rawhide.

Fox used her in Bernardine (1957) with Pat Boone and Peyton Place (1957) with Lana Turner. They then put her in the less popular A Private's Affair (1959). She was Audie Murphy's leading lady in Cast a Long Shadow (1959).

1960s
Moore had the lead in Platinum High School (1960) and Why Must I Die? (1960), producing the latter.

Moore guest starred on Checkmate and The Rebel and had a regular role as a rancher's daughter in the NBC Western Empire. She also appeared on the NBC interview program Here's Hollywood.

Other appearances during this period include Black Spurs (1965), Town Tamer (1965), Bob Hope Presents the Chrysler Theatre, Waco (1966), and A Man Called Dagger (1968) as well as episodes of The Virginian, and Batman.

1970s
Moore's 1970s appearances included Quarantined (1970), Bonanza, The Daredevil (1972), Smash-Up on Interstate 5 (1976), and Death Dimension (1978).

1980s
In the 1980s Moore's roles included appearances in Double Exposure (1982), Hellhole (1985), Going Overboard (1989), American Boyfriends (1989), and Jake Spanner, Private Eye (1989) and episodes of Matt Houston, Knight Rider, Fantasy Island, The Love Boat, True Confessions, and Wiseguy.

At age 55, Moore posed nude in the August 1984 issue of Playboy magazine, photographed by Ken Marcus. She also appeared in theatre.

She appeared in and did the story for Beverly Hills Brats (1989).

Later career
Moore was in Murder, She Wrote; Marilyn and Me (both in 1991); American Southern (1995); Second Chances (1998) (which she also produced); Mighty Joe Young (1998); and Final Voyage (1999).

Moore produced but did not appear in America's Funniest Home Videos and Nandi (1998).

In the 2000s, Moore's appearances include roles in Stageghost (2000), Kill Your Darlings (2006), The Still Life (2006), Dewitt & Maria (2010), a guest-starring role as Lilly Hill on the crime series True Detective (2014), Aimy in a Cage (2015), Ray Donovan, and  Silent Life (2019).

Personal life
Moore married  American football star and Heisman Trophy winner Glenn Davis (known as Mr. Outside when he played at the U.S. Military Academy at West Point) in 1951. They were divorced the following year. One year after this marriage ended, Moore married Stuart Cramer after his divorce from Jean Peters; they had two children together, Stuart Cramer IV and actor Grant Cramer, before divorcing in 1972. In 1979, Moore claimed to have married Richard F. Carey, in Mexico; he disappeared a few days later, having swindled her and others out of their money. Her 1992 marriage to Jerry Rivers lasted until his death in 2001.

Moore became the subject of public attention as a result of her relationship with Howard Hughes. According to Moore, she and Hughes were married in 1949 in a ceremony performed by a ship captain in international waters. Moore has said that Hughes destroyed the ship's log that recorded the marriage, and they separated from each other by 1956, but she and Hughes were never divorced. Moore has explained her subsequent marriages during Hughes' lifetime by saying, "I didn't care whether I was a bigamist or not, frankly. I mean, my desire to have children was that strong."

The Texas courts rejected Moore's claim of being Hughes' widow based on judicial estoppel; since Moore had claimed in her divorce from Cramer to have been married to him in 1959 and received a property settlement in that case, her claim that she was married to Hughes at the time was inconsistent with that and would not be accepted. Nevertheless, the Hughes heirs agreed that Moore had had a long-term relationship with Hughes and agreed to a financial settlement with her. Moore described the settlement as "not more than eight figures"; a biography of Hughes implies that the settlement was $350,000.

Moore dated actor Glenn Ford in the early 1970s.

Selected filmography

References

External links

 
 
 
 
 
 Old Skool with Terry and Gita on Star!
 Stu's Show - Interview with Terry Moore, April 22, 2015

Living people
1929 births
Actresses from Glendale, California
American film actresses
American radio actresses
American television actresses
American Latter Day Saints
American memoirists
20th Century Studios contract players
United Service Organizations entertainers